There are various Major League Baseball records for triples.

175 career triples

Closest active players
There are no active players that are considered close to realistically reaching 175 career triples.

As of August 2020, there are no active players with more than 100 career triples. Dexter Fowler currently holds the record for active players, with 82.

Top 10 in career triples, 1920–present

Top 10 career triples by league

25 triples in one season

Progression of the single season record for triples

Three or more seasons with 20 triples

Six or more seasons with 15 triples

Four or more consecutive seasons with 15 triples

Twelve or more seasons with 10 triples

Eight or more consecutive seasons with 10 triples

League leader in triples

League leader in triples 4 or more seasons

League leader in triples 3 or more consecutive seasons

League leader in triples in both leagues

4+ triples by an individual in one game

110 triples by a team in one season

See also

 20–20–20 club
 List of Major League Baseball annual triples leaders

Notes
 Total includes one season in the Players' League.  Major League Baseball recognizes this year of service, but this is not universally recognized by all historians.  He hit 22 triples that season, giving him a National League career total of 221.
 Total includes 28 triples in his two years in the Players' League and American Association, giving 177 triples in his National League career.
 Total includes 76 triples in his 8 seasons with Cincinnati while they were in the American Association, giving 112 triples in his National League career.
 Total includes 13 triples in his one year in the Players' League, giving 172 triples in his National League career.
 Total includes 18 triples in his one year in the Federal League, giving 164 triples in his National League career.
 Total includes 15 triples in his one year in the Federal League, giving 167 triples in his Major League career.
 The 1901–1903 records for a single season are included because some historians do not recognize any record set prior to the "modern era" which began in 1901.

References 

Triples
Triples